Lytchett Minster and Upton is a civil parish in the English county of Dorset. The parish comprises the village of Lytchett Minster and the nearby built up area of Upton, which is contiguous with the urban area of Poole.

The parish has an area of 14.35 square kilometres. At the time of the 2001 census, it had a population of 7,573 living in 3,227 dwellings. The parish forms part of the Purbeck local government district of the county of Dorset. It is within the Mid Dorset and North Poole constituency of the House of Commons. Prior to Brexit in 2020, it was in the South West England constituency of the European Parliament.

References

External links 
Census data for Lytchett Minster and Upton parish

Civil parishes in Dorset